Be Easy may refer to:

 "Be Easy" (T.I. song), a single by T.I
 "Be Easy" (Massari song), a single by Massari
 "Be Easy" (Ghostface Killah song), a single by Ghostface Killah